Ong Bak 2: The Beginning is a 2008 Thai martial arts film co-directed by Panna Rittikrai and Tony Jaa. Starring Jaa, it is a standalone prequel to the 2003 film Ong-Bak: Muay Thai Warrior. Set in 15th century Thailand, the film revolves around Tien, the son of a murdered nobleman. Captured and sold into slavery, Tien is saved from death by Chernang, the leader of the Pha Beek Khrut, a group of martial artists specialising in various Asian combat styles. Chernang takes Tien under his wing and realizes unsurpassed physical potential in the boy by training him in all the different types of Asian martial arts. When Tien grows up, he goes on a lone mission of vengeance against the slave traders and the treacherous warlord who killed his family.

Released on 4 December 2008, the film was followed by Ong Bak 3 in 2010.

Plot 
In 1431 Siam, during the reign of Borommarachathirat II of the Ayutthaya Kingdom, Tien, the young son of a noble family, is forced to flee from enemy soldiers. He manages to escape to the forest, where he is captured by slave traders. Tien's resistance leads the traders to throw him into a pool with a Siamese crocodile, but at that moment, the Pha Beek Khrut ("Garuda Wing Cliff"), a band of bandits and martial artists, unveil themselves and attack the traders. The leader of the band, Chernang, is intrigued by the boy's physical prowess and sheer willpower, and saves him by passing him a knife to slay the crocodile with. They take him to their village, where their soothsayer claims that Tien is destined to become a great warrior, and Chernang offers him to become one of them, which Tien accepts.

Years later, an adult Tien is subjected to the tests necessary to become a true member of the Pha Beek Khrut. He successfully tames wild elephants, and afterwards he fights and defeats three other bandits, a Japanese swordsman, a Chinese fighter, and an indigenous wrestler. After Tien passes his last test, killing a demonic female martial artist, Chernang proclaims him his adopted son and heir. Tien subsequently becomes the field leader of the bandits, whose adventures make him reminisce about his previous life. His father, Lord Sihadecho, sent him to learn dances in a remote village under Master Bua instead of making him a warrior. Sihadecho wanted Tien to be safe from the commander of the Ayutthaya royal guard, Lord Rajasena, who had plotted against his family. In the village, although the young Tien disdained their peaceful life, he eventually befriended Pim, an orphan girl. Back to the present, Tien tracks down his old slave traders and beats them down in revenge, throwing their leader to the crocodiles as he did to him.

Another flashback reveals that Lord Sihadecho was betrayed by one of their own guards, who attempted to kidnap Tien, but the boy managed to flee with a loyalist's help. At the same time, Sihadecho and his household were massacred by Lord Rajasena and a mysterious masked assassin, which Tien witnessed before escaping and being found by the slave traders. In the present, Tien makes a blood oath to avenge his family, which Chernang encourages him to fulfill, promising him to make him their new leader upon his return. Tien travels alone to Rajasena's palace, where the lord is hosting a party to proclaim his power. After a dance coincidentally performed by a grown-up Pim, Tien sneaks in dressed as a khon dancer himself and attacks Rajasena, apparently cutting the treacherous lord down.

Tien returns to the Pha Beek Khrut village, but he founds it empty. He is instead confronted by the masked assassin that killed his father, whom Tien attacks, but more masked attackers emerge. Tien fights wave after wave of opponents, putting on the line every skill he learned, and eventually overcomes his enemies with the help of an elephant. However, Tien meets his match at the hands of a final opponent, Bhuti Sangkha ("Crow Ghost"), a sinister yet formidable martial artist. Bhuti defeats Tien and takes the elephant away, leaving him to be submitted by Lord Rajasena and his army. The lord turns out to have survived the assassination thanks to hidden armor, and reveals that the masked assassin is no other than Chernang, who must now finish his job from years ago in exchange for Rajasena pardoning his bandits.

As Tien reluctantly fights Chernang, the latter pins Tien down, acknowledges tearfully him as his son, and asks him to accept his own life to avenge his father. Chernang then causes the blade of Tien's sword to snap and slash across his throat, killing himself. Exhausted and devastated, Tien collapses on the ground surrounded by the soldiers, and Rajasena orders Tien to be taken away and slowly tortured to death. As the film ends, a voiceover explains that Tien suffered this fate due to his bad karma, but adds that he may find a way to cheat death. An ambiguous scene shows him with a fully-grown beard standing in front of the Ong Bak Buddha statue.

Cast 
 Tony Jaa as Tien
 Nirut Sirijanya as Master Bua
 Sorapong Chatree as Chernang
 Sarunyoo Wongkrachang as Lord Rajasena
 Santisuk Promsiri as Lord Sihadecho
 Primorata Dejudom as Pim
 Natdanai Kongthong as Young Tien
 Prarinya Karmkeaw as Young Pim
 Patthama Panthong as Lady Plai
 Petchtai Wongkamlao as Mhen
 Dan Chupong as Bhuti Sangkha / Crow Ghost (uncredited)
 Supakorn Kitsuwon as Guard in Golden Armour (uncredited)
 Tim Man as Black Ninja
 Jaran Ngamdee
 Somdet Kaew-ler
 Kaecha Kampakdee (as Gaesha Kumpakdee)

Production 
Shooting of the film began in October 2006. It was released in Thailand on December 5, 2008. In July 2008, rumor surfaced that Tony Jaa had disappeared from the production set. Prachya Pinkaew commented to the press that Tony Jaa had disappeared from the set for almost two months, leaving the film unfinished and that the delay caused more than 250 million baht damage due to the breach of contract with the Weinstein Company who had also canceled the contract. Later in an interview with the press, Tony Jaa stated that the production was on hiatus because Sahamongkol Film could not release the obligated funding for the film. Sources within Ayara Film, the subsidiary of Sahamongkol Film that handled Ong Bak 2 production, claimed that no more funding came from Sahamongkol after it took over the budget and management role from Tony Jaa from May to July 2008.

Tony Jaa and the owner of Sahamongkol Film later made a joint press conference stating that the production and funding would continue after several concessions were agreed upon between Tony Jaa and Sahamongkol. Famed Thai action choreographer and Jaa's mentor Panna Rittikrai was brought onto the project in the capacity of director to help complete the film. In addition, Rittikrai added martial artist Dan Chupong to the cast.

An international trailer for the film was released during filming, showing the fictional setting in which Tony Jaa's character is being rescued in the jungle by a group of martial artists of various styles, and trained to unify these different systems. However, production still encountered financial problems as it came to a close. In order to complete the production on time, the filmmakers decided to end Ong Bak 2 with a cliffhanger ending, and then continue the story in a sequel, Ong Bak 3, which was announced to begin production for a 2009 release.

Distribution 
Worldwide distribution and sales rights to Ong Bak 2 were purchased by The Weinstein Company in March 2006. A little over a year later, Harvey Weinstein visited Bangkok and renegotiated a deal in which Sahamongkol Film International bought back most of the rights to the film, except for North America, which The Weinstein Company retains. At the 2007 Cannes Film Festival market, Sahamongkol sold some rights to Germany-based Splendid Films.

In February 2009, Wagner/Cuban Companies' Magnolia Pictures acquired the U.S. distribution rights for Ong-Bak 2 under their Magnet label. The deal was negotiated by Tom Quinn, Senior Vice President of Magnolia, with Gilbert Lim of Sahamongkol Film International.

Reception 
The film holds a 49% rating on Rotten Tomatoes based on 70 reviews. The site's consensus reads: "It suffers from comparisons to its predecessor, not to mention Tony Jaa's less-than-nimble direction, but Ong Bak 2 has all the extravagant violence and playful style that fans of the original will expect".

Despite political turmoil in the film's native Thailand, in its opening weekend (8 December 2008) Ong Bak 2 grossed about 58 million baht ($2.06 million), according to Variety Asia Online, and was number one at the Thai box office. Ong Bak 2 did better at the Thai box office than Tony Jaa's previous film, Tom-Yum-Goong.

The film was praised by the variety of martial arts showcased, including muay boran and krabi krabong, Japanese kenjutsu and ninjutsu, Indian Kalaripayattu, Malay silat, as well as various Chinese martial arts. Jaa also showcased weapons such as the ninjatō, katana, jian, dao, talwar, nunchaku, rope dart, and three-section staff.

Home video 
There have been numerous DVD releases of Ong Bak 2. Various versions with regional subtitles and dubbings were released throughout Asia, South America, Australia and New Zealand in the months shortly after the film's premiere in its native Thailand. The film was released for the European film market on 6 February 2009. The United States version was released on February 2, 2010, although it is already available in English language version. A bootleg all-region-compatible version with English subtitles of Ong-Bak 2 was internationally released on April 2, 2009 on DVD, although this version is not as yet widely available. There are no significant reviews, such as on Rotten Tomatoes, yet.

Sequel 

With the box office success of Ong Bak 2, Sahamongkol Film International was quick to announce their intention to film its sequel. Filming of new footage for the follow-up was to begin before the end of the year and was to incorporate unused footage from Ong Bak 2. Kongdej Jaturanrasamee, screenwriter of the Thai fantasy film Queens of Langkasuka, was signed to write the script. In addition, the expensive set for the Khmer Palace was completed and seen by the press. Ong Bak 3 was released in May 2010.

The film features more fights between Tony Jaa and Dan Chupong (the uncredited actor behind the mysterious, enigmatic and deadly "crow ghost" in Ong Bak 2, the only enemy who really gets the drop on Tien in the film).

Video game

Ong Bak Tri, a video game based on Ong Bak films, was in development by Studio Hive and was to be published worldwide by Immanitas Entertainment for PC, smartphones, PlayStation Network, and Xbox Live Marketplace. The game was intended to be 2.5D side-scrolling brawler with "intense fighting action, impressive free-running sequences, and highly cinematic quick-time action events", according to the press release. The game, like the second and third films, was to be set in ancient Thailand. No official release date has been announced and the project was presumably canceled.

References

External links 

 Official site  
 
 
 
 

2008 films
2008 martial arts films
Thai-language films
Thai martial arts films
Films set in the 1430s
Muay Thai films
Thai Muay Thai films
Sahamongkol Film International films
Films shot in Thailand
Ong Bak films